Christopher Hale Clemons (born October 31, 1972) is an American former Major League Baseball pitcher who played for the Chicago White Sox in 1997.

Amateur career

Born in Baytown, Texas, Clemons attended McGregor High School in McGregor, Texas, and was selected in the 21st round of the 1991 Major League Baseball Draft by the Chicago Cubs. He opted to play baseball for the Texas A&M University Aggies, and played on the Aggies' 1993 College World Series team. In 1993, he played collegiate summer baseball in the Cape Cod Baseball League for the Yarmouth-Dennis Red Sox, where he was named the league's outstanding pro prospect. In 1994 he was an All-America and All-Southwest Conference selection,
and was drafted by the Chicago White Sox in the 1st round (33rd pick) of the 1994 amateur draft.

Professional career

He made his major league debut in 1997 with the White Sox, and appeared in five games for Chicago that year. After the 1997 season, he was selected by the Arizona Diamondbacks in the 1997 Major League Baseball expansion draft, and spent the 1998 and 1999 seasons with the Triple-A Tucson Sidewinders.

Coaching career

In 2008, he was named assistant baseball coach at McLennan Community College in Waco, Texas. In 2009, he was named manager of the Victoria Generals collegiate summer baseball team in the Texas Collegiate League, and received the league's coach of the year honors in 2009 and 2010.

References

External links

1972 births
Living people
Chicago White Sox players
Baseball players from Texas
Major League Baseball pitchers
Gulf Coast White Sox players
Hickory Crawdads players
Prince William Cannons players
Birmingham Barons players
Nashville Sounds players
Tucson Sidewinders players
Akron Aeros players
Buffalo Bisons (minor league) players
River City Rascals players
Yarmouth–Dennis Red Sox players
People from Baytown, Texas
Sportspeople from Harris County, Texas
Texas A&M Aggies baseball players